Pajewo-Szwelice  is a village in the administrative district of Gmina Gołymin-Ośrodek, within Ciechanów County, Masovian Voivodeship, in east-central Poland. The town is inhabited by 1.3% of the inhabitants of the commune. The identifier of the Pajewo-Szwelice locality in the SIMC system is 0115275.

References

Pajewo-Szwelice